Heydariyeh Rural District is a rural district (dehestan) in Govar District, Gilan-e Gharb County, Kermanshah Province, Iran. As of the 2006 census, its population was 7,890, in 1,696 families. The rural district has 22 villages.

References 

Rural Districts of Kermanshah Province
Gilan-e Gharb County